Plyoso-Kurya is a rural locality (a selo) and the administrative center of Plyoso-Kuryinsky Selsoviet, Khabarsky District, Altai Krai, Russia. The population was 396 as of 2013. It was founded in 1726. There are 8 streets.

Geography 
Plyoso-Kurya is located 30 km east of Khabary (the district's administrative centre) by road. Serp i Molot is the nearest rural locality.

References 

Rural localities in Khabarsky District